Thornhill is a closed station.  It served the country town of Thornhill in Dumfries and Galloway.  The station site is a mile or so from the town. Four miles north of Thornhill is Drumlanrig Castle, home to the Duke of Buccleuch and Queensberry. The Glasgow and South Western main line rail route between Kilmarnock and Dumfries is forced to make a long detour to the east of Thornhill and through a long tunnel, rather than the more logical route nearer Thornhill town centre and up the Nith Valley, so as not to be seen from the Buccleuch estate. The distance of the station from Thornhill may be one reason that passenger use was light and stopping services ended in 1965. There was formerly a busy livestock market near to the station, which eventually closed around 2001.

Dumfries and Galloway Council are trying to find funding to reopen the station.

Views at the station in 2009
The southbound loop has recently been opened to increase traffic paths on this line. The platforms, signal box and main building still stand at this closed station. Semaphore signalling is still used here.

Re-opening 
Suggestions have been made for a re-opening of the station.

Despite the positive case for reopening, some local residents opposed the plans in 2009, which involved some property development to pay for new a new station involving platforms to be built slightly north of the present station site.

In October 2016, the local community council in Thornhill released a survey where the village showed overwhelming support for the re-opening of the station. The current plans include building a new station slightly north of the old station.

See also 

 List of closed railway stations in Britain

References

Notes

Sources

External links
 RAILSCOT on  Glasgow, Dumfries and Carlisle Railway: map and historical notes
 Disused stations

Disused railway stations in Dumfries and Galloway
Railway stations in Great Britain closed in 1965
Railway stations in Great Britain opened in 1850
1850 establishments in Scotland
1965 disestablishments in Scotland
Beeching closures in Scotland
Former Glasgow and South Western Railway stations
Thornhill, Dumfries and Galloway